Farrowia is a genus of fungi within the Chaetomiaceae family.

Taxonomy 
In 1975, Hawksworth suggested a novel genus for F. seminuda, F. longicola, and F. malaysiensis. These species were distinguished from other Chaetomium species by their long-necked ascomata and production of anamorphs similar to Botryotrichum. However, this categorization has been controversial since its inception. In 2001, a molecular phylogenetic study using rRNA sequence data did not support the separation of Farrowia and Chaetomium.

Widden, in 1986, suggested that Farrowia seminuda and Botryotrichum piluliferum are the teleomorph and anamorph of the same organism based on their preference for coniferous soils and visual indistinguishability.

Description 
Perithecia are subglobose (imperfectly spherical), with straight, unbranched lateral and terminal hairs. The terminal hairs fuse to form a neck-like structure, potentially rudimentary. Pedestal-like rhizoidal bases are usually present. Farrowia forms asci which are clavate (club-shaped) and deliquesce before ascospores mature.The ascospores are lemoniform (lemon-shaped), biapiculate, and are not ornamented.   F. malaysiensiensis is reported  having a longer neck than the other two species in this genus.

In media cultures, reddish brown pigments are produced only in the presence of contaminants.

Ecology 
Species are widespread across tropical and temperate areas. It is most commonly found in soil, although F. longicola has been found in leaf litter and freshwater.

Chemistry and Research 
Novel interleukin inhibitors were isolated from Farrowia broths in 2003. These compounds were named EI-1941-1 and EI-1941-2. The enzymes they specifically inhibit are elastase and cathepsin B. EI-1941-2 is degraded by the presence of cysteine, but EI-1941-1 is not. Further study of these ICE inhibitors could lead to new synthetic anti-inflammatory agents.

References

Sordariales
Taxa named by David Leslie Hawksworth